Franky Barreto  is a former Indian international football player who played as a defender. After starting off with Vasco SC in 1992, Barreto went on to play for a handful of top outfits in India, including Churchill Brothers, East Bengal and Salgaocar SC. He has capped for India national team 17 times and has also captained the national side. He has played in tournaments including the Nehru Cup in 1997 and the 1998 Bangkok Asian Games.

Honours

India
SAFF Championship: 1997

Salgaocar
Federation Cup: 1997

References

Indian footballers
India international footballers
Living people
Association football defenders
Year of birth missing (living people)
Footballers from Goa
Footballers at the 1998 Asian Games
Asian Games competitors for India
Churchill Brothers FC Goa players
East Bengal Club players
Salgaocar FC players